Stanford Extended ASCII (SEASCII) is a derivation of the 7-bit ASCII character set developed at the Stanford Artificial Intelligence Laboratory (SAIL/SU-AI) in the early 1970s. Not all symbols match ASCII.

Carnegie Mellon University, the Massachusetts Institute of Technology, and the University of Southern California also had their own modified versions of ASCII.

Character set
Each character is given with a potential Unicode equivalent.

See also
Stanford Artificial Intelligence Laboratory (SAIL/SU-AI)
Stanford Artificial Intelligence Language (SAIL)
Stanford/ITS character set

References

Further reading 

 (NB. Shows a table of SEASCII differing in a few code points from that described in RFC 698.)

External links 

SEASCII

Computer-related introductions in the 1970s